The RCA CT-100 was an early all-electronic consumer color television introduced in April 1954. The color picture tube measured 15 inches diagonally. The viewable picture was just 11½ inches wide. The CT-100 wasn't the world's first color TV, but it was the first to be mass produced, with 4400 having been made. The world's first color TV set was the Westinghouse H840CK15, released in March 1954, but only 500 were made and only around 30 were sold.   The RCA sets were made at RCA's plant in Bloomington, Indiana. The sets cost $1000, half the price of a new low-end automobile. By the end of 1954, RCA released an improved color TV with a 21-inch picture tube.

The CT-100 and its Westinghouse counterpart both suffered from color fringing around the edges of objects on the image. 

The CT-100, which had 36 vacuum tubes in its CTC-2 chassis (known as "Merrill" to the marketing department) was the most complicated electronic device sold to the general public at the time of its release.  After initial sales to early adopters, the rest sold poorly, even after a price cut. Many were donated by RCA for training purposes to trade schools and technical colleges, the source of most of today's survivors. RCA sold the CT-100 
at a loss. RCA later recalled the CT-100, replacing many of them with a newer 21-inch model.

Early NBC Living Color programs included An Evening with Fred Astaire.
The CT-100 was created in 1954, before the NBC Peacock logo existed.
RCA CT-100 sets are extremely sought-after by electronics collectors and restorers, with restorers often spending thousands of dollars to obtain or repair a set.

It is believed that RCA only made 4000 CT-100 receivers.  Around 150 survive, but only 30 are restored and working. The Early Television Museum in Hilliard, Ohio has a restored and working set on display, as does the SPARK Museum of Electrical Invention in Bellingham, Washington. One reason for the rarity of surviving sets is that the RCA-developed tri-color cathode ray tube (the 15GP22) that was used in the CT-100 was notorious for its glass-to-metal seals breaking down, causing the tube to lose its vacuum. It is extremely rare to find tubes that still work. The 15G was a glass tube, but its high voltage connection is a metal ring between the face of the tube and the glass bell or funnel.  This is where the leakage often occurs.

References
Ed Reitan's CT-100 Page
Early Television Museum

Products introduced in 1954
RCA brands
Television sets